Canada is scheduled to compete at the 2021 Junior Pan American Games in Cali–Valle, Colombia from November 25 to December 5, 2021.

Canada's full team of 31 athletes (13 men and 18 women) competing in ten sports was announced on November 19, 2021. Along with the announcement, artistic gymnast Aurélie Tran and badminton athlete Brian Yang were named as co-flag bearers during the opening ceremony.

Trampolinist Remi Aubin and gold medal winning karateka Yamina Lahyanssa were named as co-flag bearers during the closing ceremony. Canadian athletes won a total of ten medals in six sports.

Competitors
The following is the list of number of competitors (per gender) participating at the games per sport/discipline.

Medallists

Badminton

Canada qualified two badminton athletes (one male and one female). Canada went on to sweep all three gold medals.

Beach volleyball

Canada qualified a women's beach volleyball pair.

Women
Kaylee Glagau
Becky Tresham

Diving

Canada qualified three divers (one male and two females).

Men
Ben Smyth

Women
Julianne Boisvert
Quinn Gariepy

Gymnastics

Canada qualified four gymnasts (two per gender).

Artistic
Canada qualified two artistic gymnasts (one per gender).
Men
Mathys Jalbert

Women
Aurélie Tran

Trampoline
Canada qualified two trampolinists (one per gender).
Men
Remi Aubin

Women
Gabriella Flynn

Karate

Canada qualified four karatekas (one male and three female).

Men
Émile Desrosiers

Women
Kristin Dixon
Yamina Lahyanssa
Megan Rochette

Modern pentathlon

Canada qualified two modern pentathletes (one per gender).

Men
Quinn Schulz

Women
Olivia Li

Squash

Canada qualified six squash athletes (three per gender).

Men
Noel Heaton
Elliott Hunt
Ryan Picken

Women
Hannah Blatt
Sydney Maxwell
Iman Shaheen

Table tennis

Canada qualified two table tennis athletes (one per gender).

Men
Jeremy Hazin

Women
Sophie Gauthier

Taekwondo

Canada qualified two taekwondo practitioners (one per gender).

Wrestling

Canada qualified four wrestlers (two per gender).

Men
Jason-Guy Luneau
Dechlan Papadopoulos

Women
Nyla Burgess
Bronwyn MacGregor

References

Nations at the 2021 Junior Pan American Games
2021 Junior
2021 in Canadian sports